The orange larch tubemaker (Coleotechnites laricis) is a moth of the family Gelechiidae. It is found in the north-eastern parts of the United States, as well as Canada.

The wingspan is 10.5–13 mm. The forewings are shining black with fawn coloured scales. The hindwings are light grey. There is one generation per year.

The larvae feed on eastern larch. The larvae mine the leaves of their host. In fall, it constructs a shelter of needles and frass along a twig where it spends the winter. After the winter it resumes feeding while it lives in a tube that is composed of needles tied together with silk.

References

External links
Image
Larval Stage info

Moths described in 1965
Coleotechnites